Caragh may refer to:
 Caragh, County Kildare, hamlet in Ireland
 Caragh GAA, based in Prosperous, near Caragh, County Kildare
 Caragh River, County Kerry, Ireland
 Caragh Lake, on the river
 Caragh M. O'Brien, author of the Birthmarked young-adult books

See also
 Cara (disambiguation)
 Carra (disambiguation)